Jack Mohr (11 July 1906 – 7 June 1971) was an  Australian rules footballer who played with St Kilda in the Victorian Football League (VFL).

Notes

External links 

1906 births
1971 deaths
Australian rules footballers from New South Wales
St Kilda Football Club players